Chosen Anderson (born May 9, 1993), known as Robert Steven Anderson until 2023, is an American football wide receiver who is a free agent. He played college football at Temple. Anderson was signed by the New York Jets as an undrafted free agent in 2016.

Formerly known as Robby Anderson, he legally modified his first name to Robbie Anderson in 2022. In February 2023, he again legally changed his first name to "Chosen."

Early years
Born in Fair Lawn, New Jersey, Anderson moved to South Florida as a child.

Anderson attended and played high school football at South Plantation High School.

College career
Anderson committed to Temple University to play college football for the Temple Owls over offers from other schools including Illinois, Indiana, and Marshall. After redshirting his first year in Philadelphia, Anderson saw time on special teams during his redshirt-freshman season and practiced primarily as a defensive back. Following Matt Rhule's hiring as Temple's head coach, Anderson switched to wide receiver in 2013 and caught 44 passes for 791 receiving yards and nine touchdowns. In the 2013 season, Anderson set a Temple school-record for receiving yards in a game with 239 against SMU. Anderson missed the 2014 season, however, due to academic eligibility issues. Anderson spent 2014 taking classes at a community college in Florida. Anderson returned to Temple for his senior season in 2015 season and had 70 catches for 939 yards. Anderson's reception and yardage totals were the second most ever by a Temple player in school history. Anderson was selected to the Eastern College Athletic Conference All-Conference team and Third Team All-Conference team by Phil Steele in recognition of his senior season. Following his senior season, Anderson was selected to play in the 2016 East–West Shrine Game.

College statistics

Professional career

New York Jets

2016 season
Despite running a 4.36-second 40-yard dash at Temple's pro day, Anderson went undrafted in the 2016 NFL Draft. On May 1, 2016, the New York Jets signed Anderson to a three-year, $1.63 million contract that included a signing bonus of $10,000 as an undrafted free agent.

Anderson entered training camp competing against Jalin Marshall, Chandler Worthy, Jeremy Ross, and Charone Peake to be the Jets' fifth wide receiver. He went on to lead all players in the 2016 pre-season in receiving yards with 264, and also had 13 catches and three touchdowns, which helped him earn a spot on the Jets' final 53-man roster and become their fifth wide receiver entering the regular season, behind Brandon Marshall, Eric Decker, Quincy Enunwa, and Jalin Marshall.

He made his professional regular season debut in the New York Jets' season-opening 23–22 loss to the Cincinnati Bengals. On September 25, 2016, Anderson made his first career reception on a 26-yard pass from Ryan Fitzpatrick and finished the 24–3 loss to the Kansas City Chiefs with a total of two receptions for 34 receiving yards. The next game, Anderson was named the Jets' starting slot receiver against the Seattle Seahawks and finished the 27–17 loss with two catches for 12 receiving yards. Following Eric Decker's season-ending injury on October 12, 2016, Anderson became Jets' starting slot receiver. On December 5, 2016, he made four receptions for 61 yards and caught his first career touchdown on a 40-yard pass from Bryce Petty. The New York Jets went on to lose to the Indianapolis Colts 41–10. The following week, Anderson had a season-high six catches and 99 receiving yards in a 23–17 victory over the San Francisco 49ers. In a Week 15 matchup against the Miami Dolphins, he led the Jets with 80 receiving yards, made four receptions, and caught a 40-yard touchdown pass from Petty as the Jets lost by a score of 34–13.

He finished his rookie season with 42 receptions, 587 receiving yards, and two touchdowns in 16 games and eight starts.

2017 season

Anderson started his second season with six receptions for 50 receiving yards combined over his first two games, a 21–12 loss to the Buffalo Bills and a 45–20 loss to the Oakland Raiders. In Week 3, a 20–6 victory over the Miami Dolphins, he had three receptions for 95 receiving yards and his first receiving touchdown of the season. During Week 7, in the second divisional game against the Miami Dolphins, Anderson was held to 35 receiving yards on three catches. Prior to the final play in the fourth quarter, Anderson threw his helmet in rage, frustrated that he wasn't getting enough targets, which drew an unsportsmanlike conduct penalty. On October 27, Anderson was fined $12,154. During Week 8 against the Atlanta Falcons, Anderson performed far better as he posted his first career game with over 100 receiving yards. He had 106 receiving yards on six catches, including one touchdown and a one-handed catch for 32 yards in a 25–20 loss. During Week 12 against the Carolina Panthers, Anderson highlighted big plays, including a 54-yard touchdown and a 33-yard touchdown, extending his touchdown streak to five games, leading all NFL wide receivers. He finished with 146 receiving yards but the Jets lost 35–27. During Week 13 against the Kansas City Chiefs, Anderson finished with 107 receiving yards as the Jets won 38–31. Over the final four games of the regular season, he combined for 14 receptions for 120 receiving yards. Overall, he finished his second professional season with 63 receptions for 941 receiving yards and seven receiving touchdowns.

2018 season
Over the first four games of the 2018 season, Anderson had been limited to eight receptions for 108 yards and one touchdown. During Week 5 against the Denver Broncos, Anderson highlighted two big plays with touchdowns 76 yards and 35 yards respectively. He finished the game with 123 receiving yards on three receptions as the Jets won 34–16. During Week 16 against the Green Bay Packers, Anderson finished with 140 receiving yards and a touchdown as the Jets lost 38–44 in overtime. He finished the season as the Jets leading receiver with 50 receptions for 752 yards and six touchdowns.

2019 season

On February 28, 2019, the Jets placed a second-round restricted free agent tender on Anderson.

During Week 6 against the Dallas Cowboys, Anderson finished with five catches for 125 yards, including a 92-yard touchdown as the Jets won 24–22. During Week 14 against the Miami Dolphins, Anderson finished with seven catches for 116 receiving yards and a touchdown as the Jets won 22–21. Overall, Anderson finished the 2019 season with 52 receptions for 779 receiving yards and five receiving touchdowns.

Carolina Panthers

2020 season
On April 1, 2020, the Carolina Panthers signed Anderson to a two-year, $20 million contract that included $12 million guaranteed and a signing bonus of $8 million. The signing reunited Anderson with former Temple head coach and recently hired Carolina Panthers' head coach Matt Rhule and former Temple teammates Keith Kirkwood, P. J. Walker, and Colin Thompson.

Anderson made his debut with the Panthers in Week 1 against the Las Vegas Raiders.  Anderson finished the game with six catches for 115 receiving yards and a touchdown from former Jets' teammate Teddy Bridgewater as the Panthers lost 30–34. During Week 2 against the Tampa Bay Buccaneers, Anderson finished with nine receptions for 109 receiving yards as the Panthers lost 17–31. 
During Week 5 against the Atlanta Falcons, Anderson finished with eight receptions for 112 receiving yards as the Panthers won 23–16.
In Week 12 against the Minnesota Vikings, Anderson recorded 4 catches for 94 yards, including a 41-yard touchdown reception, during the 28–27 loss. Anderson finished the 2020 season with 95 receptions for 1,096 receiving yard and three receiving touchdowns.

On August 24, 2021, Anderson re-signed with the Panthers on a two-year contract extension worth $29.5 million, which extended through the 2023 season.

2021 season
During Week 1, against the New York Jets, Anderson had a 57-yard touchdown on his only reception of the game as the Panthers won 19–14. Anderson finished the 2021 season with 53	receptions for 519 receiving yards and five receiving touchdowns.

2022 season
Anderson began the season with 102 yards and a touchdown in a Week 1 matchup against the Cleveland Browns In Week 6 against the Los Angeles Rams, Anderson was kicked out the game by interim head coach Steve Wilks after Anderson got into an argument with wide receiver coach Joe Dailey.

Arizona Cardinals
On October 17, the day after the game against the Rams, Anderson was traded to the Arizona Cardinals for a 2024 sixth round draft pick and a 2025 seventh round draft pick.

On March 8, 2023, he was released by the Cardinals.

NFL career statistics

References

External links

 Arizona Cardinals bio
 Temple Owls bio

1993 births
Living people
American football wide receivers
American sportspeople convicted of crimes
Carolina Panthers players
New York Jets players
Arizona Cardinals players
People from Fair Lawn, New Jersey
People from Teaneck, New Jersey
Players of American football from New Jersey
South Plantation High School alumni
Sportspeople from Bergen County, New Jersey
Temple Owls football players